Julianne Aguilar is an artist and writer. She wrote "We've Always Hated Girls on the Internet: A Wayback Machine Investigation", a story about internet harassment and internet vulnerability.  She is interested in the way people create identities through their presence on the internet. Her work focuses on her appeal to the ability for the modern world to be able to connect though social media platforms and other forms of internet communication. She works primarily in digital media and video-making. She currently lives in Santa Fe, New Mexico.

Education 
Aguilar received her BFA in Photography at the College of Visual Art and Design, University of North Texas in 2009. In 2016, she got her MFA in Electronic Arts at the Department of Art and Art History, University of New Mexico.

Works of art 
Time to Die (2018) is a video project that uses animation and subtext. Evidence (2018) is an ongoing project about her failed attempt to log-in to internet accounts to locate her identity. Selfies (2018) is also an on-going project that documents photographs, images, and other graphics that Aguilar identifies as self-portraits.

Publications 
2018 "We Have Always Hated Girls Online"
2017 "The Names We Leave Behind
2014 "Net Chick"

Exhibitions 
2017 There Are No Girls On The Internet, Localhost Gallery
2017 Take Me Away, Friends and Neighbours Gallery, Montreal, Quebec, Canada
2016 Fwd:<no-reply>, The Alice, Seattle, WA

References 

Living people
Artists from Texas
Year of birth missing (living people)